The Dravidian Linguistics Association is a learned society of scholars of Dravidian languages, based in Thiruvananthapuram. It holds the annual "Conference of Dravidian Linguists". The president is P.T. Murugaretnam (Madurai Kamaraj University).

History 
The association was established on March 15, 1972 by V. I. Subramonium (University of Kerala), R. C. Hiremath (Karnataka University), and Mahadeva Sastry (Sri Venkateswara University). To attract an international scholarship, the "International School of Dravidian Linguistics" was formed on February 25, 1977 with R. C. Hiremath as first internal and Franklin C. Southworth as the first external directors. A Council of Direction was also constituted. The first annual "Conference of Dravidian Linguists" was held in 1971.

The five southern states, Kerala, Tamil Nadu, Telangana, Andhra Pradesh  and Karnataka of India have their own mother-tongue, respectively as Malayalam, Tamil, Telugu and Kannada which constitute the Dravidian Languages.  Dravidian Linguistics Association is promoting this co-existence and contributing to the research of history, growth and intersecting attributes of the Dravidian Languages. In this respect, the Malayalam Verbal forms is one of the premier attempt by the Association at its foundation year itself in 1972 written by V. R. Prabodhachandran Nayar.
University of Kerala linguistic department maintains a close association with the Dravidian Linguistics Association.

Governing Council 
As per the web site (http://www.ijdl.org/Html/officebearers.pdf) following are the latest names of the Governing Council for the year 2017-2018. Prof. B. Ramakrishna Reddy (Chairman), Prof. G K Panikkar (Director),Prof. K Vishwanatham (President), Prof.V Syamala (Vice-President, Correspondent),Prof. Naduvattom Gopalakrishnan (Secretary), Dr. S Abdul Samad (Treasurer).

Journal 
The association publishes the International Journal of Dravidian Linguistics, a biannual peer-reviewed academic journal. It was established in 1972.

References

External links 
 

Dravidian studies
Scientific societies based in India
Linguistic societies
1972 establishments in Kerala